Austria have participated 2 times at the UEFA Women's Championship: Their best achievement is reaching the 
UEFA Women's Championships semi final in (2017).

UEFA Women's Championship 

*Draws include knockout matches decided on penalty kicks.

References 

 
Euro
Countries at the UEFA Women's Championship